Kugahara Station is the name of two train stations in Japan:

 Kugahara Station (Chiba) (久我原駅)
 Kugahara Station (Tokyo) (久が原駅)